Morlanwelz is a municipality of Wallonia located in the province of Hainaut, Belgium. 

On 1 January 2006 Morlanwelz had a total population of 18,595. The total area is 20.26 km2 which gives a population density of 918 inhabitants per km2. Its postcode is 7140.

The municipality consists of the following districts: Carnières, Mont-Sainte-Aldegonde, and Morlanwelz-Mariemont.

Sister cities
 Villarosa, Italy (2002)
 Le Quesnoy, France
 Pleszew, Poland
 Blaj, Romania

Notable people of Morlanwelz 
Born in Morlanwelz:
Elio Di Rupo (1951), Walloon Minister President.
 (1835–1880), industrialist and promoter of Belgian horticulture after whom the arum Anthurium warocqueanum was named.

Resided in Morlanwelz:
 Raoul Warocqué (1870–1917), Belgian industrialist and Mayor of Morlanwelz (1900–1917)
Marino Stephano née Stéphane Marino (1974-1999), Belgian Trance music producer and DJ.

Image gallery

See also
Morlanwelz train collision and runaway
Musée royal de Mariemont

References

External links
 
 Official website

Municipalities of Hainaut (province)